Pararhabdochaeta albolineata is a species of tephritid or fruit flies in the genus Pararhabdochaeta of the family Tephritidae.

Distribution
Indonesia.

References

Tephritinae
Insects described in 1985
Diptera of Asia